Vieni avanti cretino (Come On Idiot) is a 1982 Italian comedy film directed by Luciano Salce.

It had a great commercial success, grossing over 3 billion lire at the Italian box office.

Cast 
Lino Banfi: Pasquale Baudaffi
Franco Bracardi: Gaetano Baudaffi
Anita Bartolucci: Marisa 
Dada Gallotti: Dentista
Gigi Reder: Ingegnere dal dentista
Michela Miti: Carmela
Dino Cassio: Don Peppino 
Nello Pazzafini: Salvatore Gargiulo 
Adriana Russo: Ragazza al bar 
Alfonso Tomas: Dr. Tomas 
Luciana Turina: Padrona del barboncino

See also       
 List of Italian films of 1982

References

External links

1982 films
Italian comedy films
1982 comedy films
Films directed by Luciano Salce
Films scored by Fabio Frizzi
1980s Italian films